Telio (stylized as Tel.io) is a Norwegian telecommunications company that provides VoIP telephony services in Norway, Denmark and the Netherlands with a total of 200,000 customers, making it the second largest VoIP service provider in Norway, after Telenor. It is also a virtual supplier of GSM mobile subscriptions.

Founded in 2003, it was the first company to offer VoIP in Norway when it launched the service in 2004. At the time, its competitive advantage was that it offered a fixed price without any minute fees; include free calls to Western Europe, the United States and Canada. The company was placed on the Oslo Stock Exchange in 2006. The company has announced that it will target small and medium sized businesses. In 2007 it launched a cooperation with Tandberg to create a new platform for video based VoIP.

On 20 December 2012, Telio bought NextGenTel. NextGenTel being the 2nd largest xDSL provider in Norway, gave Telio a unique position in the market being able to deliver VoIP, Mobile, Internet & IP TV from their own platform. Full quad-play service all within their own platform. Telio's own free smartphone app Goji  that saw the light on 27 April 2011 has kept gaining a lot of users especially in the Middle East and in USA/Canada.

References 

Telecommunications companies of Norway
VoIP companies of Norway
Telecommunications companies established in 2003
Companies based in Oslo
Videotelephony
2003 establishments in Norway
Companies listed on the Oslo Stock Exchange